Samnang Prak (born 1 January 1949) is a Cambodian former freestyle swimmer. He competed in three events at the 1972 Summer Olympics. He won a bronze medal in the 4 x 100 metre freestyle relay at the 1970 Asian Games.

References

External links
 

1949 births
Living people
Cambodian male freestyle swimmers
Olympic swimmers of Cambodia
Swimmers at the 1972 Summer Olympics
Asian Games bronze medalists for Cambodia
Asian Games medalists in swimming
Swimmers at the 1970 Asian Games
Medalists at the 1970 Asian Games
Place of birth missing (living people)
Swimmers at the 1974 Asian Games
Southeast Asian Games medalists in swimming
Southeast Asian Games silver medalists for Cambodia
Competitors at the 1973 Southeast Asian Peninsular Games